Black Brick Road is the sixth studio release by the gothic metal band Lake of Tears. It was released in 2004, after the band's reunion and signing to Noise Records. The album brought back the gothic sound of their earlier work, combined with some progressive elements.

Track listing 
All songs written by Lake of Tears, except "Sister Sinister" written by Lake of Tears and Stina Rebelius. All lead guitar composed by Magnus Sahlgren.

Personnel 
 Daniel Brennare - vocals, guitar
 Mikael Larsson - bass
 Johan Oudhuis - drums

Additional personnel
Jörgen Cremonese - guitars
Ulrika Silver - vocals
Stina Rebelius - vocals
Dan Helgeson - organ
Magnus Sahlgren - guitars
Björn Engelmann - mastering
Henrik Lycknert - engineering, mixing (assistant)
Manne Engström - engineering, mixing
Christian Silver - producer, engineering, mixing
Björn Gustaffson - artwork, layout
Anton Hedberg - photography

External links
 Encyclopaedia Metallum bands by letter - L - Lake of Tears - Black Brick Road (retrieved 8-18-07)

2004 albums
Lake of Tears albums
Noise Records albums